The Christian Church in Luwuk Banggai is a Reformed denomination in Indonesia, a member of the World Communion of Reformed Churches.

Christianity came to Luwuk Banggai in 1912, brought by Dutch missionaries, and established the Protestant Church in Indonesia. The Minahasa church become independent in 1934, and the church in Luwuk transferred its membership to the Minahasa denomination. The Luwuk Banggai church become independent in 1966. Half of the 226 congregations are located in the mainland of Sulawesi, the other half in Banggai Archipelago, with 73,000 members.

References 

1966 establishments in Indonesia
Calvinist denominations established in the 20th century
Reformed denominations in Indonesia
Members of the World Communion of Reformed Churches
Christian organizations established in 1966